Richard Lewis Schantz is an American soccer coach. He co-founded FC Tucson in 2010 and was its first head coach. He was also head coach of Phoenix Rising FC in the USL Championship.

Coaching record

Honors
USL Championship Coach of the Year
Winner: 2019

Personal life
Schantz is a native of Tucson, Arizona, and graduated from Salpointe Catholic High School.

Homophobia controversy
During a Phoenix Rising game with San Diego Loyal on September 30, 2020, midfielder Junior Flemmings was accused of using a Jamaican homophobic slur against the openly gay Loyal midfielder Collin Martin. Loyal, who had been leading 3-1 up to that point, walked off the field in protest and forfeited the match.

Video capturing an exchange between Rising coach Rich Schantz and Loyal coach Landon Donovan over the incident led to claims of Schantz telling Donovan that the incident was "part of the game," that the players were "competing," as well as accusations that Schantz tried to downplay the incident. Schantz later denied such accusations, saying his words were "misconstrued," and that he was not excusing "any alleged homophobic behavior" from his players.

The incident led to an investigation by USL Championship, and Schantz was placed on administrative leave following the incident. Team officials say Schantz's placement on administrative leave was unrelated to the investigation, but did later say the administrative leave was related to his initial reaction to the incident, which team officials categorized as "dismissive". Schantz later apologized to Martin, as well as his team, the USL Championship league, and the LGBTQ community over the incident, and subsequently resumed his coaching duties on October 21.

Leaves Phoenix Rising FC
Schantz parted ways with Phoenix Rising FC on August 17, 2022.

References

Living people
American soccer coaches
FC Tucson coaches
Phoenix Rising FC coaches
Year of birth missing (living people)
Portland Pilots men's soccer players
USL Championship coaches
USL League Two coaches
Soccer players from Tucson, Arizona
Association footballers not categorized by position
Association football players not categorized by nationality